Leyendecker is the surname of several people:

Ulrich Leyendecker (b. 1946), German composer of contemporary classical music
Frank Xavier Leyendecker (1877–1924), American illustrator (younger brother of J. C. Leyendecker)
Joseph Christian Leyendecker (1874–1951), American illustrator (older brother of F.X. Leyendecker)
Hans Leyendecker (b. 1949), German journalist

Leyendecker is an occupational surname, meaning 'slate roofer' in Middle High German and Middle Dutch.

Leyendecker may also refer to

"Leyendecker", a track by Battles from their 2007 album, Mirrored

References

Occupational surnames